The Roman Catholic Diocese of Atlacomulco (erected 3 November 1984) is a suffragan diocese of the Archdiocese of Toluca.

Bishops

Ordinaries
 Ricardo Guízar Díaz (3 November 1984 Appointed – 14 August 1996 Appointed, Archbishop of Tlalnepantla, México)
 Constancio Miranda Wechmann (27 June 1998 Appointed – 29 September 2009 Appointed, Archbishop of Chihuahua, Chihuahua) 
Juan Odilón Martínez García (30 April 2010 Appointed – present)

Other priest of this diocese who became bishop
Maximino Martínez Miranda, appointed Bishop of Ciudad Altamirano, Guerrero in 2006

Episcopal See
Atlacomulco, State of México

External links and references

Atlacomulco
State of Mexico
Atlacomulco, Roman Catholic Diocese of
Atlacomulco
Atlacomulco
1984 establishments in Mexico
Atlacomulco